Mertz is a surname. Notable people with the surname include:

 Albert Mertz (1920–1990), Danish painter
 Albrecht Mertz von Quirnheim, (1905–1944), German officer and resistance fighter involved in the 20 July Plot against Adolf Hitler
 Barbara Mertz (1927–2013), author of mystery and suspense novels, pseudonyms Elizabeth Peters and Barbara Michaels
 Dolores Mertz (born 1928), American politician
 Ellen Louise Mertz (1896–1987), Danish geologist
 Elizabeth Mertz, American linguistic and legal anthropologist
 Harold Mertz, designer of the standard crash test dummy
 Johann Kaspar Mertz (1806–1856), Austrian guitarist and composer
 LuEsther Mertz (1905–1991), founder of Publisher's Clearinghouse
 Stephen Mertz (born 1947), American novelist
 Xavier Mertz (1883–1913), Swiss Antarctic explorer

Fictional characters:
 Fred and Ethel Mertz, fictional couple on I Love Lucy

See also
 Mertz Glacier, Antarctica, named after Xavier Mertz
 Merz (surname)

German-language surnames
Surnames from given names